The 2023 Nobel Peace Prize is an international peace prize established according to Alfred Nobel's will that will be announced on October 2023 by the Norwegian Nobel Committee in Oslo, Norway, and awarded on 10 December 2023.

Candidates
On February 22, the Norwegian Nobel Committee revealed that they received a total of 305 official candidates for the 2023 Nobel Peace Prize out of which 212 are individuals and 93 are organizations. The number for this year was less compared to the 343 candidates last year and currently the lowest since 2019. The highest record of candidates was in 2016. Though nominations are strictly kept a secret, several Norwegian parliamentarians and other academics are privileged to publicly announce their preferred candidates simply to raise publicity both for the nominee and the nominator.

Qualified nominators
According to the statutes of the Nobel Foundation, a nomination is considered valid if it is submitted by a person or a group of people who falls within one of the following categories:

Prize committee
The following members of the Norwegian Nobel Committee are responsible for the selection of the Nobel laureate(s) in accordance with the will of Alfred Nobel: 
 Berit Reiss-Andersen (chair, born 1954), advocate (barrister) and former President of the Norwegian Bar Association, former state secretary for the Minister of Justice and the Police (representing the Labour Party). Member of the Norwegian Nobel Committee since 2012, reappointed for the period 2018–2023.
 Asle Toje (vice chair, born 1974), foreign policy scholar. Appointed for the period 2018–2023.
 Anne Enger (born 1949), former Leader of the Centre Party and Minister of Culture. Member since 2018, reappointed for the period 2021–2026.
 Kristin Clemet (born 1957), former Minister of Government Administration and Labour and Minister of Education and Research. Appointed for the period 2021–2026.
 Jørgen Watne Frydnes (born 1984), former board member of Médecins Sans Frontières Norway, board member of the Norwegian Helsinki Committee. Appointed for the period 2021–2026.

Notes

References

External links
 The Nobel Peace Prize nobelpeaceprize.org

2023
Nobel Peace Prize